Dancing Queens is a 2021 Swedish comedy-drama film directed by Helena Bergström, written by Bergström and Denize Karabuda. It stars Molly Nutley, Fredrik Quiñones, Marie Göranzon, and Mattias Nordkvist.

Plot
Dylan Pettersson, a 23-year-old young woman from a small island in the Bohuslän archipelago, aspires to be a professional dancer. She’s talked into covering cleaning duties at the struggling gay drag club Queens for a week. Victor, the club’s star dancer and choreographer, discovers Dylan's talent, and she desperately wants to be a dancer on the show, but she's a girl — and it's a drag show.

Cast

Release
Dancing Queens was digitally released by Netflix on June 3, 2021.

Reception

References

External links 
 
 
 

2021 films
2021 LGBT-related films
2020s dance films
2020s Swedish-language films
Gay-related films
Swedish comedy-drama films
Swedish LGBT-related films
Swedish-language Netflix original films